Barbu is a male Romanian given name or a surname; of obscure origin, it may derive from either the word barbă ("beard") or serve as the masculine form of Barbara.

As a given name
Barbu Alinescu (1890–1952), Romanian general in World War II
Barbu Bellu (1825 – 1900), Romanian baron and politician
Barbu Brezianu (1909 – 2008), Romanian poet, art critic, art historian and judge
Barbu Catargiu (1807 – 1862), Romanian politician and journalist
Barbu III Craiovescu (d. 1565), de facto  Prince of Wallachia
Barbu Ștefănescu Delavrancea (1858 – 1918), Romanian dramatist and poet
Barbu Fundoianu (1898 – 1944), Romanian and French poet-philosopher
Barbu Iscovescu (1816 – 1851), Romanian painter and revolutionary
Barbu Lăzăreanu (1881 – 1957), Romanian literary historian, bibliographer and left-wing activist
Barbu Paris Mumuleanu (1794 – 1836), Wallachian poet
Barbu Nemțeanu (1887 – 1919), Romanian poet
Barbu Solacolu (1897 – 1976), Romanian poet and social scientist
Barbu Dimitrie Știrbei (1799 – 1869), Prince of Wallachia
Barbu Știrbey (1872 – 1946), Prime Minister of the Kingdom of Romania
Barbu Vlădoianu (1812 – 1876), Romanian general officer and politician

As a surname 
Alexandru Barbu (b. 1987), Romanian alpine skier
 Constantin Barbu (b. 1971), Romanian football player
 Daniel Barbu (b. 1957), Romanian political scientist
 Eugen Barbu (1924 – 1993), Romanian novelist and journalist
 Filaret Barbu (1903 – 1984), Romanian operetta composer
 Florin Barbu (b. 1974), Romanian bass guitarist
 Gelu Barbu (1932 – 2016), Romanian-born Spanish ballet dancer and choreographer
 Gheorghe Barbu (b. 1951), Romanian politician
 Ion Barbu (1895 – 1961), Romanian mathematician and poet
 Marga Barbu  (1929 – 2009), Romanian actress
Marin Barbu (b. 1958), Romanian football coach and former footballer
 Natalia Barbu (b. 1979), Moldovan singer and songwriter
 Petre Barbu (b. 1962), Romanian writer

 Ștefan Barbu (1908 – 1970), Romanian football player
 Sulfina Barbu (b. 1967), Romanian politician
 Viorel P. Barbu (b. 1941), Romanian mathematician

See also 
 Ion Barbu (disambiguation)

References

Romanian masculine given names
Romanian-language surnames